The Estonian Legion was a military unit within the Combat Support Forces of the Waffen-SS  during World War II, mainly consisting of Estonian soldiers.

Creation 
The formation was announced on 28 August 1942 by the German occupying powers in Estonia and formally established on October 1, 1942. Oberführer Franz Augsberger was nominated to be the commander of the legion and the later 3 Estonian SS Volunteer Brigade. 500 volunteers had appeared and signed up for the Legion by October 13, 1942. In the spring of 1943 additional men were drafted from the police forces and the number rose to 1,280.

Units

Battalion Narva 
Battalion Narva was formed from the first 800 men of the Legion who had finished their training at Dębica (Heidelager in 1943), and were sent in April 1943 to join the Division Wiking in Ukraine.  They replaced the Finnish Volunteer Battalion, recalled to Finland for political reasons.

The Battalion Narva was in the focus of the Red Army's attack near Izjum, Ukraine. The unit entered the battle with 800 men, and only one third were left able to fight. The Red Army, however, suffered heavier losses as they lost over 7,000 men killed and wounded, over 100 tanks were lost.

Battalion Narva participated in the battle of the Korsun-Cherkassy Pocket. Retreating through the escape route called The Hell's Gate, the battalion came under heavy Soviet fire with little cover. The battalion lost almost all of its equipment during the carnage while most of the troops escaped encirclement.

3rd Estonian SS Volunteer Brigade 

In order to recruit more men for the legion, the German Occupying powers turned to forced mobilization in March 1943 by calling up all Estonian men born between 1919–1924. As the result 5,300 men were conscripted into the Estonian Legion and 6,800 for the support service of the Wehrmacht. Out of the conscripts was formed the second Estonian Regiment and the Estonian SS Volunteer Brigade was established on May 5, 1943.

Another conscription call was announced in October 1943 for men born in 1925–1926. As the result in order to avoid the draft about 5,000 men escaped to Finland. Most of these men volunteered for service in the Finnish Defence Forces and formed the Finnish Infantry Regiment 200. The conscripts were included with the Estonian SS Volunteer Brigade that was renamed the 3 Estonian SS Volunteer Brigade on October 22, 1944.

20th Waffen Grenadier Division of the SS 

By January 1944 the German military situation in the Eastern front had worsened so far that a general conscription call was announced in Estonia on February 1, 1944. In the hopes of restoring the independence of Estonia the last prime minister of Republic of Estonia Jüri Uluots gave his support to the draft. As the result about 38,000 men were conscripted, the units of Estonian Legion, the Finnish Infantry Regiment 200 were returned to Estonia and were reformed into the 20th Waffen Grenadier Division of the SS (1st Estonian).

See also 

Estonia in World War II
Latvian Legion
Legion of French Volunteers Against Bolshevism

References

External links 
Website dedicated to Estonian Legion (in Estonian)

Military history of Estonia during World War II
Foreign volunteer units of the Waffen-SS
Generalbezirk Estland
Military of Estonia
Military units and formations established in 1942
Military units and formations disestablished in 1943